The Bartizan of Porto Pim is a medieval watchtower located in the civil parish of Angústias, in the municipality of Horta.

History
The bartizan was integrated into the complex of fortifications that ringed the coast of Porto Pim, under the coordination of the Fort of São Sebastião. It was a simple watchtower with the function of guarding the southwest entrance into the bay.

The watchtower was classified as a Property of Public Interest in 1984 and later in 2004.

Architecture

It was erected in the extreme western edge of the bay of Porto Pim, addorsed to the hexagonal plan of decorated stone. The structure was implanted in the cliffs at the edge, with walls extending towards the direction of the bay. The bartizan is a hexagonal structure with window surmounted by a pyramidal covering.

References

Notes

Sources
 
 

Bartizan Porto Pim
Porto Pim Bartizan
Bartizan Porto Pim